Will Ryder (born Jeff Mullen; July 31, 1960) is an American pornographic film director, producer, screenwriter, publicist, camera operator, and composer.

Early life 
Ryder was born in Milwaukee, Wisconsin and he is of English and Finnish descent. He worked as a keyboardist in the music industry for fifteen years.

Career 
In 1983, Ryder befriended pornographic actress Amber Lynn while he was seeking employment in the adult film industry as a composer for pornographic films. Lynn introduced him to other people in the business and director Roy Karch was the first to hire him. He left the industry before returning in 2001 as a publicist for New Sensations/Digital Sin. In 2001, he launched the PR firm All Media Play. In 2004, he launched his own production label, X-Play, and made his directorial debut with the film Britney Rears Wild Back Stage Sex Party.

Awards and nominations

References

External links 
 
 
 

American keyboardists
American male composers
21st-century American composers
American male screenwriters
American people of English descent
American people of Finnish descent
American pornographic film directors
American pornographic film producers
American publicists
Living people
Musicians from Milwaukee
Writers from Milwaukee
Screenwriters from Wisconsin
21st-century American male musicians
1960 births
American parodists
Parody film directors